Abegondo is a municipality of Spain in the Province of A Coruña, in the autonomous community of Galicia. It has an area of 83.72 km² (32.32 mi²), a population of 5,732 (2004 estimate) and a population density of 68.47 people/km² (177.35 people/mi²). It is part of the semi-coast region between the municipality of Cambre and the historic town of Betanzos.

Parroquias

Cidade Deportiva de Abegondo
In the municipality there is located the Cidade Deportiva de Abegondo (also known as "El Mundo del Futbol", which is Spanish for "Football World"), that serves as the home stadium for Deportivo Fabril and Deportivo de La Coruña Femenino. It is also the training ground of the men's club Deportivo de La Coruña. It was opened in 2003.

The stadium facilities are the central stadium with a capacity of 1,000 seats, 6 grass pitches, 1 fieldturf pitch, 6 seven-a-side pitches and a service building with gymnasium.

External links

Official site

References

Municipalities in the Province of A Coruña